A.O. Floriada Football Club is a Greek football club, based in Floriada, Aetolia-Acarnania, Greece. Although the village of Floriada is located in Aetolia-Acarnania, the team of A.O. Floriada Football Club participates in Arta FCA championships.

Honours

Domestic Titles and honours

 Arta FCA champion: 1
 2017-18

References

Football clubs in Epirus
Arta (regional unit)
Association football clubs established in 1981
1981 establishments in Greece
Gamma Ethniki clubs